In music, Op. 31 stands for Opus number 31. Compositions that are assigned this number include:

 Alkan – Preludes, Op. 31
 Barber – Summer Music
 Beethoven – Piano Sonata No. 16
 Beethoven – Piano Sonata No. 17
 Beethoven – Piano Sonata No. 18
 Britten – Serenade for Tenor, Horn and Strings
 Chopin – Scherzo No. 2
 Elgar – A Song of Flight
 Elgar – After
 Enescu – Vox Maris
 Farrenc – Piano Quintet No. 2
 Górecki – Symphony No. 2
 Gottschalk – Souvenir de Porto Rico
 Prokofiev – Tales of an Old Grandmother
 Rachmaninoff – Liturgy of St. John Chrysostom
 Saint-Saëns – Le rouet d'Omphale
 Schillings – Mona Lisa
 Schoenberg – Variations for Orchestra
 Schumann – 3 Gesänge
 Tchaikovsky – Marche slave
 Vierne – Vingt-quatre pièces en style libre